The 2012 Campeonato da Primera Divisåo de Profissionais - Módulo I (official name: Campeonato Mineiro Chevrolet 2012), better known as 2012 Campeonato Mineiro, was the 98th season of Minas Gerais' top-flight football league. The season began at January 29 and ended on May 13.

Format
The first stage is a single round robin. The top four teams will be qualified to the playoffs, and the bottom two teams will be relegated to the 2013 Módulo II

Qualifications
The best three teams will qualify for 2013 Copa do Brasil. The best two teams not playing in Campeonato Brasileiro Série A, Série B or Série C will qualify for 2012 Campeonato Brasileiro Série D.

Teams

First stage

Results

Playoffs

Overall table

References

2012
Mineiro